Raghunathapuram is a village located in Nalgonda district, Telangana, India. This village is 12 km from the famous hill temple Yadagirigutta. This village has population of ~6,000.

This village is famous for manufacturing cotton cloth material of variety designs and exports to other parts of the world. 

Education

This village has two government schools. The primary school is Z.P.H.S Raghunathapuram that offers 6-10th standard in both Telugu and English medium. The Z.P.H.S school has produced many talented students who are currently working across the world and employed under multi-national companies. Few of the students also graduated in M.B.B.S, service in Police department and other state and central govt. departments.

Villages in Nalgonda district

Economy

The village revenue is primarily generated from Handlooms. The other sources of income include agriculture, grocery stores and other small business centers such as textile shops, electronic gadget/device repair centers, ladies emporium, construction material suppliers.

Culture

The village comprises mostly with Hinduism, others include Muslim and Christian population. The village celebrates all the Hindu festivals grandly. Dasara, Vinayaka Chaviti and Bonalu are popular.